"Cheers Then" is a song recorded by English girl group Bananarama.  It appears on their 1983 debut album Deep Sea Skiving and was released as its third single in November 1982, a few months before the album.  The song was the first Bananarama single to be written by group members Sara Dallin, Siobhan Fahey and Keren Woodward and also their first ballad release.

Coming off three consecutive top-ten hits, "Cheers Then" peaked at a disappointing number forty-five in the UK singles chart.  Fahey said in a 1986 interview about this song, "We started taking our careers seriously after 'Cheers Then' bombed.  Before then we thought all groups just brought out records and had them go to the top of the charts. It brought us down to reality a bit."

Even with its relatively low sales, the song is regarded by critics as one of Bananarama's best recordings.  The group's fortunes would rebound, however, with their UK follow-up single, a cover version of Steam's "Na Na Hey Hey Kiss Him Goodbye".

The B-side, "Girl About Town," has been issued on CD for the first time on the 2007 UK reissue of Deep Sea Skiving as one of five bonus tracks. However the version used is a slightly longer version (3:31) with an additional 4 bars just before the instrumental break (roughly 1:45 - 1:59).

Cover 
The single's cover shows cartoons of Dallin, Fahey and Woodward perched atop a graffiti-covered wall. Adrian Gurvitz's name is visible on the top left corner of the wall.

Music video

The music video was a recreation of the musical film The Sound of Music. Filmed in Salzburg, the girls re-enact many of the scenes from the film, including the step-jumping scene for "Do-Re-Mi" and running in the hills, and the gazebo scene.

Versions

 7" vinyl single
London Records NANA 3
"Cheers Then"  3:29
"Girl About Town"  3:10

 12" vinyl single
London Records NANX 3
"Cheers Then" (Extended Version)  5:19
"Girl About Town" (Extended Version)  5:31
S. Dallin/S. Fahey/K. Woodward

Charts

References

1982 singles
Bananarama songs
London Records singles
Songs written by Sara Dallin
Songs written by Siobhan Fahey
Songs written by Keren Woodward
1982 songs